Margaret Murray (1863–1963) was a British Egyptologist and anthropologist.

Margaret Murray may also refer to:
Margaret Deborah Murray or Margaret Murray Cookesley (1844-1927), English painter
Margaret Lindsay Murray (1848–1915), Irish scientist, contributor to the Encyclopædia Britannica
Margaret Murray Washington (1859–1925), third wife of Booker T. Washington, Lady Principal of the Tuskagee Normal and Industrial Institute
Margaret Polson Murray (1865–1927), Canadian social reformer and magazine editor
Margaret Lally "Ma" Murray (1908–1982), co-founder and editor of the Bridge River Lilloet News and the Alaska Highway News
Margaret Murray (music educator) (1921–2015), British music educator
Peg Murray (born 1924), American actress
Margaret Murray (baseball) (died 2006), All-American Girls Professional Baseball League player
Meg Murry, a character in the novels of Madeleine L'Engle

See also
Murray (surname)